Jack Sinclair may refer to:

 Jack Sinclair (cyclist) (born 1992), Australian long-distance cyclist and scout
 Jack Sinclair (footballer) (born 1996), Australian rules footballer for St Kilda
 Jack Sinclair (Scouting) (fl. 2004), president and international commissioner of Scouts Canada
 Jack Sinclair (poker player) (born 1990), English professional poker player

See also
John Sinclair (disambiguation)
Jonathan Sinclair (disambiguation)